Ayoze is a given name of Canarian origin. Notable people with the name include:

 Ayoze Díaz Díaz (born 1982), Spanish association football left back and manager
 Ayoze García (born 1985), Spanish association football left back playing in the United States
 Ayoze Pérez (born 1993), Spanish association football forward
 Ayoze Placeres (born 1991), Spanish association football defender